The 2012–13 WHL season is the 47th season of the Western Hockey League (WHL). The regular season began in September 2012 and ended in March 2013. The playoffs began in late March 2013 following the regular season and ended in mid-May 2013, with the Portland Winterhawks winning the Ed Chynoweth Cup and a berth in the 2013 Memorial Cup hosted by the Saskatoon Blades.

Standings

Conference standings 

x – team has clinched playoff spot

y – team is division leader

z – team has clinched division

e – team is eliminated from playoff contention

Statistical leaders

Scoring leaders 
Players are listed by points, then goals.

Note: GP = Games played; G = Goals; A = Assists; Pts. = Points; PIM = Penalty minutes

Goaltenders 
These are the goaltenders that lead the league in GAA that have played at least 1440 minutes.

Note: GP = Games played; Mins = Minutes played; W = Wins; L = Losses; OTL = Overtime losses; SOL = Shootout losses; SO = Shutouts; GAA = Goals against average; Sv% = Save percentage

2013 WHL Playoffs

Conference Quarter-finals

Eastern Conference

(1) Edmonton Oil Kings vs. (8) Kootenay Ice

(2) Saskatoon Blades vs. (7) Medicine Hat Tigers

(3) Calgary Hitmen vs. (6) Swift Current Broncos

(4) Red Deer Rebels vs (5) Prince Albert Raiders

Western Conference

(1) Portland Winterhawks vs. (8) Everett Silvertips

(2) Kelowna Rockets vs. (7) Seattle Thunderbirds

(3) Kamloops Blazers vs. (6) Victoria Royals

(4) Spokane Chiefs vs. (5) Tri-City Americans

Conference Semi-finals

Eastern Conference

(1) Edmonton Oil Kings vs. (7) Medicine Hat Tigers

(3) Calgary Hitmen vs. (4) Red Deer Rebels

Western Conference

(1) Portland Winterhawks vs. (4) Spokane Chiefs

(2) Kelowna Rockets vs. (3) Kamloops Blazers

Conference Finals

Eastern Conference

(1) Edmonton Oil Kings vs. (3) Calgary Hitmen

Western Conference

(1) Portland Winterhawks vs. (3) Kamloops Blazers

WHL Championship

(W1) Portland Winterhawks vs. (E1) Edmonton Oil Kings

Playoff scoring leaders
Note: GP = Games played; G = Goals; A = Assists; Pts = Points; PIM = Penalty minutes

Playoff leading goaltenders
Note: GP = Games played; Mins = Minutes played; W = Wins; L = Losses; GA = Goals Allowed; SO = Shutouts; SV& = Save percentage; GAA = Goals against average

WHL awards

All-Star Teams

Eastern Conference

Western Conference

See also 
 2013 Memorial Cup
 List of WHL seasons
 2012–13 OHL season
 2012–13 QMJHL season
 2012 in ice hockey
 2013 in ice hockey

References

External links 

 Official website of the Western Hockey League
 Official website of the Canadian Hockey League
 Official website of the MasterCard Memorial Cup
 Official website of the Subway Super Series

Western Hockey League seasons
Whl
WHL